Eric Manizabayo (born 28 August 1997) is a Rwandan cyclist, who currently rides for UCI Continental team . He competed in the road race at the 2022 UCI Road World Championships, and won the 2022 Rwandan National Road Race Championships.

Manizabayo was born in the village of Jenda, and dropped out of school at the age of 12 to work as a bike taxi operator. He began cycling competitively in 2015.

Major results

2016
 National Junior Road Championships
2nd Road race
2nd Time trial
2017
 National Junior Road Championships
1st  Road race
3rd Time trial
2018
 2nd Team time trial, Africa Cup
2019
 8th Overall Tour du Sénégal
2020
 10th Overall Tour du Rwanda
2022
 1st  Road race, National Road Championships
 9th Overall Tour du Rwanda

References

External links

1997 births
Living people
Rwandan male cyclists
Cyclists at the 2022 Commonwealth Games
Commonwealth Games competitors for Rwanda